Mors Principium Est (Latin for "death is the beginning") is a Finnish melodic death metal band formed in 1999.

History 
The band was formed in 1999 in Pori, Finland by singer/lead guitarist Jori Haukio, guitarist Jarkko Kokko and keyboardist Toni Nummelin. Drummer Mikko Sipola joined in late 1999, soon followed by the arrival of new vocalist Ville Viljanen in early 2000 when Haukio decided to focus on his guitar work. Bassist Teemu Heinola was not appointed until after the band's first demo, Before Birth, which attracted attention from French record label Listenable Records in 2001.

One year and two demos later, Mors Principium Est signed a three-album contract with Listenable Records completed by the album Liberation = Termination released in March 2007.

The band announced on 25 April 2007 the new lineup of the band.  Karri Kuisma joined the band as the rhythm guitarist in 2006 and lead guitarist Tomy Laisto joined the band in 2007.  Jarkko Kokko will still be a member of M.P.E. but he will not play any live shows.

In March 2011, the band stated that members Tomy Laisto and Kalle Aaltonen had parted ways to pursue other ventures. The band stated "If we still want to continue with Mors Principium Est, we need new guitar players" and proceeded to ask for anyone who could try out around the world to do so.

On 30 April 2011, the band announced on their website that Andy Gillion had been recruited as the first replacement guitarist. On 29 September 2011 the band announced on their website that Andhe Chandler had been recruited as the second replacement guitarist.

In April 2012, the band signed a new deal with AFM Records, with the first single for fourth album ...And Death Said Live being released in October of the same year, followed by an album release in December in Japan, then a United States release in January 2013. The band's deal with AFM would continue with Dawn of the 5th Era in 2014, Embers of a Dying World in 2017, and Seven in 2020.

In June 2021, the band announced that they had parted ways with Andy Gillon, with Gillon being unaware of his removal. In February 2022, the band would announce a compilation album of rerecorded material called Liberate the Unborn Inhumanity, with a new rendition of "The Lust Called Knowledge" from their debut album Inhumanity being released on the same day. The album would later be released on April of the same year.

Lineup

Current members
 Ville Viljanen – vocals (2000–present)
 Teemu Heinola – bass (2001–2020, 2021–present)
 Jarkko Kokko – guitars (1999–2009, 2021–present)
 Jori Haukio – vocals, guitars (1999–2000); guitars, programming (2000–2007, 2021–present)
 Marko Tommila – drums (2021–present)

Former touring musicians
 Jarkko Kokko – guitars (1999–2009), live guitar (2020-2021)
 Lauri Unkila – live guitar (2017–2021)
 Iiro Aittokoski – live drums (2017–2021)
 Joni Suodenjärvi – live bass guitar (2018–2021)

Former members
 Andy Gillion – lead guitar, programming, songwriting (2011–2021)
 Mikko Sipola – drums (1999–2007, 2007–2017)
 Tomy Laisto – lead guitar (2007–2011), live guitar (2016-2018)
 Toni Nummelin – keyboards (1999–2004)
 Joona Kukkola – keyboards (2004–2007)
 Karri Kuisma – rhythm guitars (2007–2008)
 Marko Tommila – session drums (2007, 2020)
 Tom "Tomma" Gardiner – rhythm guitars (2008–2009)
 Kalle Aaltonen – rhythm guitar (2009–2011)
 Andhe Chandler – rhythm guitar (2011–2014)
 Kevin Verlay – rhythm guitar (2014–2015)

Timeline

Discography

Albums
 Inhumanity (2003, reissued in 2006)
 The Unborn (2005)
 Liberation = Termination (2007)
 ...And Death Said Live (2012)
 Dawn of the 5th Era (2014)
 Embers of a Dying World (2017)
 Seven (2020)
 Liberate the Unborn Inhumanity (2022)

Demos
 Before Birth (2000)
 Valley of Sacrifice (2001)
 Third Arrival (2002)

References

External links
 
 Listenable Records

Finnish melodic death metal musical groups
Musical groups from Pori
Musical groups established in 1999
Musical quintets
1999 establishments in Finland
Listenable Records artists
AFM Records artists